Several ships of the Royal Navy have been named HMS Howe, after Admiral Richard Howe:
  was the ex-Indian merchantman Kaikusroo; renamed to Dromedary in 1806 and sold in Bermuda in 1864 after many years service as a prison hulk.
  was a 120 gun ship of the line, built in 1815 and broken up in 1854.
 , launched 1860, was a 121-gun steam line-of-battle ship, renamed Bulwark, and then renamed Impregnable in 1886.
 , a proposed , was laid down in 1916 and cancelled in 1917.
 , launched 1940, was a  battleship.

Battle honours
Ships named Howe have earned the following battle honours:
Arctic, 1942−43
Sicily, 1943
Okinawa, 1945

See also
 , a hired armed vessel wrecked on the south coast of the Isle of Wight in March 1780.

Note

References

Royal Navy ship names